Before the Rain (Pred doždot) is a 1994 film written and directed by Milcho Manchevski, starring Katrin Cartlidge, Rade Šerbedžija, Grégoire Colin and Labina Mitevska, photographed by Manuel Teran, edited by Nicolas Guster and featuring an original score by the Macedonian band Anastasia. The sophisticated interplay of three seemingly unrelated short narratives and the emotional effect of the masterful directing were highly praised by the reviews and festivals, and appreciated by audiences in more than 50 countries.

Plot
Set against the background of political turbulence in Macedonia and contemporary London, three love stories intertwine to create a powerful portrait of modern Europe.

When a mysterious incident in the fabled Macedonian mountains blows out of proportion, it threatens to start a civil war, and brings together a silent young monk, a London picture editor, and a disillusioned war photographer in this tragic tale of fated lovers. Told in three parts, and linked by characters and events, Before the Rain explores the uncompromising nature of war as it ravages the lives of  the unsuspecting, and forces the innocent to take sides.

Story notes
Upon watching the film, the viewer sees that the sequence of sections could have been any of three (Words, Faces, Pictures; Faces, Pictures, Words; or Pictures, Words, Faces). An intended inconsistency becomes apparent. The end of Words shows Zamira gunned down and killed by her family when she tries to escape them. Still photos of the scene are shown in Faces.  Suddenly the reappearance of Zamira's photo and Kiril's voice (in a telephone call) in Pictures, coupled with the ending, which returns to the beginning, could temporarily hoodwink the viewer that this is the first part of the film. But a close observation of the man lying dead near the beginning of Words shows he is Aleksandar Kirkov, while Zamira is hiding in Kirill's after having killed one of the Macedonians. Faces, set in London, has a living Aleksandar Kirkov, whose close friend Anne is developing black-and-white pictures of a dead Zamira. The motto of the film is, "The Circle is not Round."  The message is written as graffiti on a wall shown in Pictures and is repeated in the other two parts by Father Marko. The director suggests that in life, people and places may change, but overshadowing scenarios (such as conflicts) go backward and forward in a cycle.

Cast

Themes
One of the main points of focus in the film is the ethnic clash that existed between Orthodox Macedonians and the Albanian Muslim minority in the early 1990s. It offers a view on how sociocultural norms and mechanisms can give rise to nationalism that grows into phobia of the foreign. Additionally, through the character of Aleksandar, the film offers a view of the "cultural shock" and foreignness he experiences upon reintegrating and returning to his home country after being away.

Production  
The creation of the film served partly as a homecoming for Manchevski, who had lived in New York City since the 1980s. That said, the film was initially not set in Macedonia. Manchevski had originally hoped to sidestep political specifics by setting the film in an anonymous country.

The film's non-linear three-act structure was inspired by Aleksander Petrović's film Three (1965) . The film also contains allusions to Sergei Eisenstein, Andrei Tarkovsky, and others. For example, the scene where Aleksandar whistles "Raindrops Keep Fallin' on My Head" while riding his bicycle is a conspicuous nod to Butch Cassidy and the Sundance Kid, directed by George Roy Hill.

Release and box office
The film was distributed in more than 50 countries. It was a hit in the cinemas in Italy, Sweden (where it stayed in the theaters for 54 weeks), Turkey, Argentina, Brazil, Mexico, FR Yugoslavia, etc. In the US theaters it grossed $763,847.

Critical reception
On review aggregator website Rotten Tomatoes, the film holds an approval rating of 92% based on 36 reviews. The website's critical consensus reads, "This haunting anti-war film offers insight into the reasons for the long history of ethnic wars within the Balkan states." Film critic Roger Ebert described Before the Rain as one of the best films of the year and dubbed it "extraordinary". He further praised Manchevski's "clear, ironic, elliptic style" and called it "an art film about war, in which passions replace ideas".<ref>{{cite web|url=https://www.rogerebert.com/reviews/before-the-rain-1995|title=Before the Rain movie review & film summary (1995) by Roger Ebert (March 10, 1995)|first=Roger|last=Ebert|author-link=Roger Ebert|work=Rogerebert.com|date=10 March 1995|access-date=15 February 2020}}</ref>

Awards and nominations
At the 67th Academy Awards that took place in 1995, the film was nominated in the category for Best Foreign Language Film, marking the Republic of Macedonia's first nomination ever in the award show. However, it lost to the film Burnt by the Sun by Nikita Mikhalkov. The film also won the Golden Lion at the 51st Venice International Film Festival, alongside Vive L'Amour by Tsai Ming-liang. It was also nominated for the Grand Prix in 1996 by the Belgian Syndicate of Cinema Critics. In addition to the aforementioned awards, the film also won 30 other awards.

LegacyThe New York Times writers Vincent Canby and Janet Maslin included Before the Rain in their book The New York Times Guide to the Best 1000 Movies Ever Made'' published in 1999. The film has been part of the curricula at numerous universities and in the Italian and Turkish high schools. An interdisciplinary academic conference in Florence was dedicated to the film, and it has been the subject of numerous essays and books. Katarzyna Marciniak, a scholar from Ohio University argued in her essay that the film, in addition to being a cautionary tale for people from the Former Yugoslav Republic, it also served as a message to Westerners and American citizens "to recognize the problematic 'doubleness' embedded in the concept of national identity".

Home video releases
 2008  The Criterion Collection, Region 1 DVD (Spine #436), June 24, 2008 — Includes audio commentary by Milcho Manchevski and film scholar Annette Insdorf, an interview with Rade Serbedzija, a short 1993 documentary about the making of the film, and an essay by film scholar Ian Christie.
 It has also been released in Italy, Brazil, UK, France, Turkey, North Macedonia, Japan, Argentina, and Mexico.

Soundtrack
The music for the film was written and performed by Anastasia. It was released on a CD in 1994 by PolyGram Records, and sold thousands of copies worldwide.

The song Sanjam by Indexi is also briefly featured.

See also
 List of submissions to the 67th Academy Awards for Best Foreign Language Film
 List of Macedonian submissions for the Academy Award for Best Foreign Language Film

References

External links

Before the Rain: Never-Ending Story an essay by Ian Christie at the Criterion Collection

1994 films
Albanian-language films
English-language Macedonian films
Films shot in Bitola
Macedonian-language films
Golden Lion winners
1990s war drama films
Independent Spirit Award for Best Foreign Film winners
Best Foreign Film Guldbagge Award winners
Gramercy Pictures films
PolyGram Filmed Entertainment films
Hyperlink films
Fratricide in fiction
Films set in North Macedonia
Films set in London
1994 drama films
1990s English-language films
Films directed by Milcho Manchevski
1994 multilingual films
Macedonian multilingual films